A Cold, Cold Winter is a 1996 Italian romantic comedy film directed by Roberto Cimpanelli.

For this film Cimpanelli won the 1997 Nastro d'Argento for best new director.

Cast 
 Cecilia Dazzi: Rosanna
 Carlotta Natoli: Monica
 Paola Tiziana Cruciani: Danila
 Marco Messeri: Gianfrancesco
 Frédérique Feder: Guya
 Armando De Razza: Bruno 
 Carlo Croccolo: Dr. Crocchia
 Riccardo Garrone: Lawyer Rossi Mannelli
 Valerio Mastandrea: Roby
 Francesca Reggiani: Ginevra 
 Francesca Rettondini: Luana

References

External links

1996 films
1996 romantic comedy films
Italian romantic comedy films
1996 directorial debut films
1990s Italian-language films
1990s Italian films